"You Got F'd in the A"  (often retitled "You Got..." or "You Got Served" on television listings) is the fourth episode of the eighth season of the Comedy Central series South Park, and the 115th episode overall.  Going by production order, it is the 5th episode of Season 8 instead of the 4th. Originally broadcast on April 7, 2004, the episode (and its title) is a satire of the movie You Got Served, which was released earlier that year.

In the episode, Stan has been challenged to a dance-off, and it is up to him to put together a team of South Park's best dancers to compete against a troupe from Orange County, California. While Butters has won awards for his dancing, he refuses to help Stan. He has not been able to dance since the tragic death of eight (conditionally as high as eleven) audience members at his last competition.

Plot
Stan and his friends are playing with radio-controlled cars when a group of kids from Orange County come and dance in front of them, thus "serving" them. The group leaves after trash-talking Stan and the boys, who are left confused by the confrontation. The kids talk to Chef, unaware of what being "served" entails. Chef immediately shows great concern, and calls their parents to inform them about the ordeal and assure them that their children are safe. Later, over dinner, Randy Marsh gets upset about his son being served and "teaches" him to dance back with a few very basic line dancing steps to the tune of Billy Ray Cyrus' "Achy Breaky Heart".

The next time Stan gets served by the Orange County kids, he serves them back, switching CDs on the boombox so that he may dance to "Achy Breaky Heart". "You just got F'd in the A!", says Cartman to the Orange County kids, who respond by declaring that "it's on"; there is now a dance contest to be had, the Orange County kids versus the best dancers in South Park.

Sharon berates Randy about his telling and teaching Stan to dance back, as it was this which led to it being "on". Randy goes to the Orange County team to apologize and make it clear that "it's not on; it's off", but the Orange County coach takes this as a challenge and goes on to serve Randy with some exceptional dance moves. Randy winds up in the hospital with the worst case of "being served" that his doctor has ever seen. After an exchange in the hospital, Stan hopes that he is finally being let off the hook, but Randy makes it clear that he expects Stan to avenge him at the competition.

Stan goes out to find the town's best dancers: Michael, the leader of the goth kids' gang (who only agrees to do so after the others dismiss the dance contest as too conformist, thus showing he is non-conformist enough to refuse to conform to even his fellow goths); an Asian kid named Yao, who is a Dance Dance Revolution expert (yet claims he cannot dance without the machine, a pastime he perceives as stupid); and Mercedes, the manager of Raisins (as Michael insists they need a girl on their team or everyone will think they're "fags"). Needing a fifth member, Mercedes suggests Butters, who was once state tap-dancing champion. When they ask him to join, however, he is stunned and runs away screaming.

It is revealed through flashback that, in 2002, Butters' shoe flew off during the national Tap-Dancing Finals, hit a stage light in the rafters, and led to an extremely gruesome chain of events that left eight people in the audience dead. (Butters later learns to his horror from Stan that the total death count was actually eleven, because one woman was pregnant and two others killed themselves after the tragedy.) This all happened to the upbeat (and risqué) tune of "I've Got Something in My Front Pocket for You". Butters flatly refuses to participate in the show, even after further pressing, so the team has to settle for a dancing duck named Jeffy from a local farm. Jeffy has not danced to any songs other than those about drug use and domestic violence played by the farmer, all to extensively modified lyrics of the song "The Crawdad Song".

On the day of the performance, Jeffy's ankle gets sprained during practice. The team looks likely to be forced to forfeit, as competition rules require a mandatory five members. Just in time, though, Butters suddenly arrives in his tap-dancing outfit, allowing the kids to perform. When they do, however, Butters' shoe flies off again and hits a stage light, causing the rafter to fall on and kill the entire Orange County team and their coach. Although Butters is horrified by this, the South Park team wins by default, and a bloodstained, screaming and horribly traumatized Butters is carried off and hailed as a hero.

Release
The episode was released on the two-disc DVD collection A Little Box of Butters.

References

External links
 "You Got F'd in the A" Full episode at South Park Studios
 

South Park (season 8) episodes